Iba N'Diaye (1928 – October 5, 2008) was a French-Senegalese painter.  Trained in Senegal and France during the colonial period, N'Diaye utilised European modernist fine arts training and medium to depict his views of African realities. He returned to Senegal upon its independence, and became the founding head of Senegal's national fine arts academy.  Disenchanted with the prevailing artistic and political climate of mid-1960s Dakar, N'Diaye returned to France in 1967 and exhibited around the globe, returning to his birthplace of Saint-Louis, Senegal, to present his work in Senegal again only in 2000. N'Diaye died at his home in Paris in October, 2008 at the age of 80.

Early life and training
Born in Saint Louis, Senegal, in a religious family, He was rapidly exposed to the catholic artwork within a Church of his hometown. When he was 15 years old began his studies at the prestigious Lycée Faidherbe.  As a student he painted posters for cinemas and businesses in his town. He studied architecture in Senegal before traveling to France in 1948, where he began studying architecture at the École des Beaux-Arts in Montpellier.  The sculptor Ossip Zadkine introduced him the traditional African sculpture, and he traveled throughout Europe, studying art and architecture.
N'Diaye frequented jazz music clubs while in Paris in the 1940s, and his interest in the medium continues to show itself in his work.   In Paris he studied fine art at the École des Beaux-Arts and Académie de la Grande Chaumière.

Return to Africa
When Senegal achieved independence in 1959, he returned at the request of President Léopold Senghor, to found the Department of Plastic Arts at the National School of Fine Arts of Senegal in Dakar. There he exhibited his work in 1962 and worked as a teacher until 1966. He taught and inspired a generation of fine artists, including painters such as Mor Faye.

N'Diaye, along with Papa Ibra Tall and Pierre Lods founded the Ecole de Dakar, a genre that allied painting, sculpture and crafts into the literary movement of Négritude: an attempt to assert a distinctively African voice in the arts, free of, if borrowing elements from, the traditions of colonial nations. "Africanité" (Africanness) combined the Negritude of Senghor and the Pan-Africanism of decolonialism.  N'Diaye, however, remained committed to teach the fundamentals and techniques of Western art, at times putting him at odds with his fellow teachers and artists.  He wrote of the danger of "Africanness" sliding back into a simplistic Noble savage self-parody if rejecting Western forms meant rejecting a rigorous technical background.  The pursuit of this "instinctive" Africanness is best exemplified by Papa Ibra Tall, who felt that African artists must "unlearn" western habits, tapping instinctual African creativity.  Tall and N'Diaye were the two best-known French-educated Senegalese fine artists of their time.  While Tall's vision was to win out in the short term, the 1970s and 80s saw a reappraisal of N'Diaye's positions and an eventual rejection of the more straightforward state-sponsored "Africanité".  President Senghor, as a poet one of the founders of Negritude, devoted as much as %25 of the Senegalese budget to the arts and was seen as the patron of artists like the Ecole de Dakar. Misgivings by artists such as N'Diaye (as well as outright opposition by artists such as film-maker/author Ousmane Sembène) fed into a later creative break with Negritude, in the 1970s led by the Laboratoire Agit-Art art community in Dakar.  N'Diaye's disenchantment and return to France in 1967 came just a year after the World Festival of Black Arts was founded in Dakar: a triumph of the "Africanité" arts.

N'Diaye died in Paris on October 4, 2008 at the age of 80 of heart failure. The Senegalese Ministry of Culture is coordinating his interment, beside his mother, in the Catholic cemetery of Saint-Louis, Senegal. Upon the artist's death, President of Senegal Abdoulaye Wade called N'Diaye the "Father-founder of Senegalese Modern Art."

Influences & Fights 
Iba N’Diaye were among these african artists taxed of hybrid, because of the crossbreeding from the western form of art and Senegalese background of his artworks. However, he claimed that the development of african art was intrinsically linked to the colonial legacy, but also through the interaction with the world, as he declared:

    “I think everyone is a hybrid, nobody, no matter what the civilization, can say that his originality is simply an originality of place. Originality goes beyond original provenance, thanks to the acquisition from and contact with others. There is therefore, always a mixing, the mixing is a universal part of being human” 

Thereby, he opposed himself against the African Primitivism that tend to claim an african art purely african.

Jazz 
Thus N’Diaye’s works transcend barriers of race, culture, aesthetic, by capturing the past, the present to highlight existential issues. One of the most notable influences in his works, is Jazz. From the streets of New Orleans to Harlem, crossing the ocean to Paris, knew as the Jazz capital in Europe, the artist, as most of his fellow Africans in the diaspora, will readily fall in love with the afro-americain rhythmics and the spontaneousness of the genre which recall the west African rhythms and the noble ancestral art of the Griot. Moreover, it is to its intrinsic connotation of fight against racism, discrimination, alienation that N’Diaye tried to attune his voice, in the aim to lay hold of this powerful channel of protest, recusant and of autodetermination, in a timeless dimension, through the use of his academic artistic knowledge. In addition, noteworthy it is to see the manifest will of N’diaye to spotlight the impact of women in the burgeoning modern afro-american culture, but especially in their front position in fighting against segregation, represented in his series on Jazz, notably in “Hommage à Bessie Smith” (1986) <<Homage to Bessie Smith>> or “Trio” (1999). This last, can let us reflect about these feminine Jazz figures but active civil right activists as Billie Holiday with her famous performance of “Strong fruit”, or Nina Simone with “Young, gifted and Black” which became a popular civil rights anthem. Thereby, N’diaye place himself as a feminist figure regiving praise to the place of the woman in african societies, where with continuous past years of cultural and religious brewing has been corrupted.

Religion 
In addition, the religious influence of Islam - born from a muslim father- is observable via the series “Tabaski” ( ritual Muslim sacrifice of lamb). Yet, N’diaye is not making directly the critic of Islam; instead tried to paint through the ingeniousness of this animal devoted to suffer for the sins of man, the destructive nature of the human-being, the suffering, the brutality. The painting “La ronde, à qui le tour?” <<Who’s Next?>>, illustrates the violence of the human being on nature, more on his alike. In fact, the artist wants to tell to the spectator that everybody, even him can be the lamb, as said Deleuze: “La viande est la zone commune de l’homme et de la bête, leur zone d’indiscernabilité, elle est ce « fait », cet état même où le peintre s’identifie aux objets de son horreur ou de sa compassion” << Meat is the common area of man and beast, their zone of indiscernibility, it is this "fact", this very state where the painter identifies with the objects of his horror or his compassion >>. Hence, the artist’s use of color palette that depicts butchery scenes tends to make us aware of violence abuse found in genocide, killings, oppression, as he declared : “Les éléments plastiques que sont la couleur du sang, le sol craquelé des latérites africaines, la ronde sacrificielle me sont apparus comme des traductions possibles de l’oppression d’un peuple sur un autre ou d’un individu sur un autre”  <<The plastic elements that are the color of the blood, the cracked soil of African laterites, the sacrificial round appeared to me as possible translations of the oppression of one people on another or of an individual on another>>.

Africa & Europe 
During his peregrinations in Europe’s museums and Africa, Iba N’diaye assess the past via the artistic productions that prevailed from Velasquez to Picasso, to some primitive African masks and sculptures. Through the means of sketches and drawings, N’diaye succeed to master the forms and techniques of paintings that he observed and fastidiously analysed. Considering “Head of a Djem Statuette Nigeria”  (1976) or “Study of an African Sculpture” (1977), they demonstrate the studious control in N’diaye’s drawings, yet remind the analogy between the series of The cry of Edvard Munch and those of N’Diaye; though completely reappropriated in terms of form, details and subject to the negro context of freedom acquiring. The question of racism and injustice is discussed with the painting “Juan de Pareja attacked by Dog” (1986), where the narrative of Juan de Pareja, a slave moors who was granted freedom thanks to his art, is revised in the stolidness of the subject which prefers to not answer to the bestiality, but let his talent speak for himself.

The works of the artist presented as souvenir, where the landscapes painted witness the weight of his experiences from the Senegalese urban market to the sub-saharan desert landscapes to France. From all these various influences, Iba N’diaye stand not as a purely african painter but simply as a painter clever of the utmost rigor required by the tradition, in order to express himself through a common language, whose the mastering frees him from convention. N’diaye, master of his art where the mix of cultures do not confront but rather joins each other for a universal sake.

Exhibition history
Working at his Parisian "la Ruche Atelier" and his home in the Dordogne, N'Diaye painted some of his best-known works, a series on the theme of the biblical ritual slaughter of a lamb: the "Tabaski" series, exhibiting them at Sarlat in 1970 and at Amiens in 1974.

N'Diaye exhibited his paintings in New York City (1981), in the Netherlands (1989); in 1990 in Tampere (1990), and at the Museum Paleis Lange Voorhout in The Hague (1996). In 1987 was the subject of a retrospective at the Museum für Völkerkunde in Munich. In 2000, he returned to Saint Louis for his first exhibition in Senegal since 1981.  In 1977, he was the subject of a retrospective at the Musée Dynamique, while in 1981, his work was presented at the Centre culturel Gaston Berger de Dakar. Since that time major showing of his work was staged at the Senegalese Galerie nationale (2003) and the Musée de la Place du Souvenir (2008), both in the Senegalese capitol.

Work
Influenced equally by western Modernism and African tradition, one reviewer described him as "a Senegalese painter whose insistence that African artists can be whatever they want to be". N’Diaye’s works do not evolve in a chronological manner, rather in thematic series in which each theme is developed throughout time, allowing the pencil of the artist to be fully expressed. Critics usually categorize his works in these themes: the Jazz, Tabaski, The Cries, Landscapes and Portraits. His study of African sculpture has shown in his subjects, but treated in colors and mood reminiscent of abstract expressionism.  Equally, Jazz musicians, painted in movement and swirls of color, have been a recurring theme in his work: his "Hommage à Bessie Smith" is perhaps the best known.

Notable works
 Tabaski la Ronde à qui le Tour - 1970
 Sahel - 1977
 The Cry / Head of a Djem Statuette Nigeria - 1976
 Study of an African Sculpture - 1977
 The Painter and his Model - 1979
 Study of a Wé Mask - 1982
 Jazz in Manhattan - 1984
 Big Band - 1986
 Juan de Pareja Attacked by Dogs - 1986
 The Cry - 1987
 Hommage à Bessie Smith - 1987
 Trombone - 1995
 Trio - 1999

References

Biography from the National Museum of African Art (United States).
Elizabeth Harney.  In Senghor's Shadow: Art, Politics, and the Avant-Garde in Senegal, 1960–1995. Duke University Press (2004)  p. 56,  63–90, 142–151, 159–66, 229.
Elizabeth Harney. Ecole de Dakar: pan-Africanism in paint and textile, African Arts,  (Autumn, 2002)
Maureen Murphy,  Harney, Elizabeth. – In Senghor’s Shadow. Art Politics, and the Avant-garde in Senegal, 1960-1995. Durham-London, Duke University Press, 2004, 316 p., Cahiers d'études africaines, 182, 2006.
 Bernard Pataux .  "Senegalese Art Today".  African Arts, Vol. 8, No. 1 (Autumn 1974), pp. 26–87
 R Lehuard.  "L'art nègre chez Picasso vu par Iba N'Diaye peintre africain".  Arts d'Afrique noire, 1986, No. 58, pp. 9–22.
 Clémentine Deliss. "Dak'Art 92:  Where Internationalism Falls Apart", African Arts, Vol. 26, No. 3 (July 1993), pp. 180–185.
 Okwui Enwezor and Franz W. Kaiser. Iba N’Diaye, peintre entre continents: vous avez dit "primitif"? (Iba N’Diaye, painter between continents: Primitive? Says who?), Paris: Adam Biro, 2002.  ND1099.N43N3834 2002. OCLC 49199501.
 Tissières, Helene. "Iba Ndiaye: corps, lumière et embrasement ou la force du baroque". Revue Ethiopiques nº83, 2009.
Iba N'diaye. Peindre est se souvenir. [s.l.]: NEAS-Sépia, 1994. (Conde-sur-Noireau (France): Corlet). ND1099.S4N332 1994 AFA. OCLC 32042768.
Portions of this article were translated from French-language Wikipedia's :fr:Iba N'Diaye.
Iba N'Diaye - Biography and Paintings." The Art History Archive - Art Resources for Students and Academics. The Art History Archive. Web. 8 Apr. 2011 
Grabski, J. and Harney, E. (2006). Painting Fictions/Painting History: Modernist Pioneers at Senegal's Ecole Des Arts: [With Commentary]. African Arts, 39(1), pp.38-94. 
Wilson, Judith. “Iba Ndiaye: Evolution of a Style.” African Arts, vol. 15, no. 4, 1982, pp. 72–72.

External links
Official website of Iba Ndiaye.
Resume at Association pour la Défense Et l'Illustration des Arts d'Afrique et d'Océanie.
Art History Archive: Biography and images of some of his works (nd).
Review of Franz Kaiser and Okwui Enwezor. Iba N'Diaye PRIMITIVE? SAYS WHO? IBA NDIAYE, PAINTER BETWEEN CONTINENTS. Adam Biro, Paris (2002), .
  Gamlin A. Diop: Images of four of Iba N'Diaye's works.

1928 births
2008 deaths
20th-century French painters
20th-century male artists
French male painters
21st-century French painters
21st-century French male artists
French people of Senegalese descent
People of French West Africa
Senegalese painters
People from Saint-Louis, Senegal
École des Beaux-Arts alumni
Alumni of the Académie de la Grande Chaumière